Knock three times can refer to:
 "Knock Three Times", a 1970 song by Tony Orlando and Dawn 
 Knock Three Times (album), a 1971 album by Billy "Crash" Craddock
 Knock Three Times, a 1917 novel by Marion St. John Webb
 Knock Three Times, a 1968 British television serial that featured Hattie Jacques
 A tap code or secret knock

See also
Knock Knock Knock, a 2002 EP by Hot Hot Heat